Gabriela Muskała (born 11 June 1969) is a Polish actress. She has appeared in such films as Courage, Królowa aniolów and Moje córki krowy and television programs such as Paradoks and Głęboka woda.

Selected filmography
 Fugue (2018)

External links
 
 FilmPolish profile

1969 births
Living people
Polish film actresses
Polish television actresses